Symphony No. 30 may refer to:

Symphony No. 30 (Haydn), also known as the Alleluia Symphony, composed by Joseph Haydn in 1765
Symphony No. 30 (Michael Haydn), composed by Michael Haydn in 1785
Symphony No. 30 (Mozart), composed by Wolfgang Amadeus Mozart in 1774

030